Afro-Arubans are Arubans who have predominantly African ancestry. Afro-Arubans are a minority ethnic group in Aruba. They speak Papiamento, an Afro-Portuguese dialect spoken in the ABC islands. The language dates back at least 300 years and is based on African linguistic structures combined with vocabulary from Portuguese, Dutch, and Spanish.

Many Afro-Arubans descend from nearby islands and nations such as Sint Maarten, Dominican Republic, Suriname, Haiti, Jamaica, Curaçao, the Lesser Antilles, and/or South America. Many Afro-Arubans live in Aruba's second largest city, San Nicolaas, located on the southern tip of the island.

History

African slaves were brought to Aruba by Dutch settlers during the colonial era.

Notable people 
 Xander Bogaerts, baseball player
 Glenbert Croes
 Gregor Breinburg
 Virginia Dementricia, rebel slave
 Denzel Dumfries, football player
 Euson, singer
 Bobby Farrell, dancer and singer 
 Gene Kingsale, baseball player
 Joshua John, Football player
 Nickenson Paul
 Niesha Butler
 Jim Jones (rapper)
 Javier Jimenez
 Matthew Lentink
 Eric Abdul
 Boy Ecury
 Jurriën Timber
 Quinten Timber

References and footnotes 

 
Afro-Caribbean
Ethnic groups in Aruba